Subash Madushan is a Sri Lankan international footballer who plays as a defender for Navy SC in the Sri Lanka Football Premier League.

International career

International goals
Scores and results list Sri Lanka's goal tally first.

References

External links
 
 
 

Sri Lankan footballers
1990 births
Living people
Sri Lanka international footballers
Association football defenders
Sri Lanka Navy SC (football) players
Sri Lanka Football Premier League players